Batea may refer to:

 Batea (aquaculture), a floating structure to grow molluscs
 Batea (genus), a genus of Amphipoda
 Batea (mythology), two characters in Greek mythology
 Batea, Tarragona, a municipality in the comarca of Terra Alta, Catalonia, Spain
 Batea, a pan used in gold panning

See also 
 Best available technology (BAT) economically achievable